The Kohat Tunnel (Kohat Surang) is a  highway tunnel under the Khigana Mountains between Kohat District of Khyber Pakhtunkhwa and Frontier Region Kohat in the Federally Administered Tribal Areas of Pakistan. The tunnel carries northbound and southbound traffic along N-55 National Highway (Indus Highway) under the Kohat Pass. The tunnel is also referred to as the Pak-Japan Friendship Tunnel, as the tunnel was constructed in assistance with the Economic Cooperation Fund of Japan.

History

Construction on the tunnel began in 1999, and opened to traffic in June 2003. As part of the developing Indus Highway system, the tunnel serves as a shorter, alternate route to the Kohat Pass, situated between the cities of Peshawar and Kohat. The new route decreases the time required to travel through the Kotal Pass by about 20 minutes. The main advantage of the tunnel is that long bodied vehicles can now use the Indus Highway whereas previously the hairpin bends on the Kotal Pass made it impossible for such vehicles to travel.  It also helps alleviate traffic congestion, improve traffic safety and promote economic development.

The tunnel was at the center of a military confrontation between the Pakistan Army and pro-Taliban militants in early 2008. The militants had taken control of the tunnel around 24 January, after hijacking trucks carrying supplies and ammunition for security forces in South Waziristan. On 27 January, Pakistan Army brought the tunnel back under control of the security forces, after "fierce fighting" involving artillery, helicopter gunships and heavy machine guns during which 24 militants were reported to have been killed.

Features and specifications
Total project cost: 
Length of north section: 7.7 kilometres
Length of south section: 22.20 kilometres
Black topped: 7.3 metres
Shoulders: 3.0 metres

References

Wars involving the Taliban
Tunnels completed in 2003
Japan–Pakistan relations
Khyber Pakhtunkhwa
Tunnels in Pakistan